Stour Valley may refer to
The valley of one of the various Stour rivers
Stour Valley Line
Stour Valley Railway
Stour Valley Walk
Stour Valley Path
Stour Valley Way
Stour Valley Community School